The 20,000 metres race walk is a racewalking event. The event is competed as a track race. Athletes must always keep in contact with the ground and the supporting leg must remain straight until the raised leg passes it. 20,000 metres is 12.4274 miles.

History
This distance is not commonly raced at high level international competitions but part of South American Championships in Athletics and individual national championships (f.e. Russia, India, Colombia, Venezuela). Top level senior athletics racewalking events typically feature 20 km road distance.

World records
On May 7, 1994, Bernardo Segura of Mexico set a new 20,000 m race walk world record in Fana in a time of 1:17:25.6. The all-time women's 20,000 m race-walk record is held by Olimpiada Ivanova of Russia, at 1:26:53.2.

All-time top 25 (outdoor)

Men
Correct as of 15 August 2018.

Notes
Below is a list of other times equal or superior to 1:20:40.3:
Nick A'Hern also walked 1:20:18.5 (1990).

Women
Correct as of June 2021.

Notes
Below is a list of other times equal or superior to 1:32:21.59:
Sandra Arenas also walked 1:31:46.9 (2014).
Marina Smyslova also walked 1:32:16.5 (2003).

All-time top performance (indoor)

Men

References

Racewalking distances